Pastrana may refer to:

 Pastrana (musical) is a 1989 Australian musical by Allan McFadden and Peter Northwood. 
 Pastrana (surname)
 Pastrana, Spain, a medieval town and municipality in the province of Guadalajara, Castile-La Mancha
 Pastrana, Leyte, a municipality in the Philippines